Bojan Popović (born February 13, 1983) is a Serbian former professional basketball player. He also represented the Serbian national basketball team internationally. He is a 1.91 m (6 ft 3 in) tall point guard.

Professional career
Popović is a product of the FMP's youth system. After spending four years as a professional at the club from Belgrade's suburb of Železnik, winning one Serbian Cup and Adriatic League trophy, he signed a contract with Russian PBL team Dynamo Moscow. His good performances led the team to the Euroleague quarterfinals, where they lost to Panathinaikos, which eventually won the cup.

Next season Bojan signed with ACB and Euroleague team Unicaja Malaga and a season later he stayed in Spain, playing for San Sebastian Bruesa.

In summer 2009, Popović signed with Lithuanian club Lietuvos rytas. On November 2, 2009, Popovic won the Euroleague MVP of the Month award for the month of October. Despite his good performances, rytas failed to qualify to the Top 16 and was eliminated from the euroleague for that season.  Nonetheless his abilities earned him a contract with Regular Season Group B rivals Efes Pilsen, but he failed to accomplish his early year performance at the Top 16.

On 25 August 2010, Popovic signed a one-year contract with KK Partizan. However, Partizan broke the contract only 20 days after signing it, because "he did not fit in the concept of playing". On November 22, 2010 he signed a three-month contract with  Cajasol Sevilla in Spain. In March 2011 he signed with Meridiano Alicante until the end of the season.

On October 12, 2011 he signed a one-year contract with Crvena zvezda. He finished the year with averages of 7 points and 3.5 assists in the Adriatic league.

In January 2013 he signed with Bulgarian team PBC Lukoil Academic until the end of season. In January 2014, he signed with the Romanian team CSU Asesoft Ploieşti for the rest of the season.

In February 2015, he signed with Trefl Sopot of the Polish Basketball League.

Serbian national team
Popović has also been a member of the senior men's Serbian national team. He played at the EuroBasket 2009, where he won the silver medal.

Euroleague career statistics

|-
| style="text-align:left;"| 2006–07
| style="text-align:left;"| Dynamo Moscow
| 22 || 22 || 25.5 || .444 || .271 || .839 || 2.9 || 1.9 || 1.7 || .0 || 10.7 || 12.8
|-
| style="text-align:left;"| 2007–08
| style="text-align:left;"| Unicaja Málaga
| 20 || 5 || 15.4 || .275 || .303 || .863 || 1.7 || 1.5 || .5 || .0 || 3.6 || 3.5
|-
| style="text-align:left;"| 2009–10
| style="text-align:left;"| Lietuvos rytas
| 10 || 9 || 32.0 || .353 || .265 || .833 || 2.4 || 5.4 || 2.4 || .2 || 11.2 || 13.6
|-
| style="text-align:left;"| 2009–10
| style="text-align:left;"| Efes Pilsen
| 6 || 0 || 13.1 || .500 || .000 || .889 || 2 || 1.3 || .6 || .0 || 3.3 || 4.8

See also 
 List of Serbia men's national basketball team players

References

External links
 Bojan Popović at abaliga.com
 Bojan Popović at acb.com
 Bojan Popović at eurobasket.com
 Bojan Popović at euroleague.net
 Bojan Popović at fiba.com

1983 births
Living people
ABA League players
Anadolu Efes S.K. players
Baloncesto Málaga players
Basketball League of Serbia players
BC Dynamo Moscow players
BC Rytas players
CB Lucentum Alicante players
Real Betis Baloncesto players
CSU Asesoft Ploiești players
Gipuzkoa Basket players
KK Crvena zvezda players
KK FMP (1991–2011) players
Liga ACB players
PBC Academic players
Point guards
Serbia men's national basketball team players
Serbian expatriate basketball people in Bulgaria
Serbian expatriate basketball people in Lithuania
Serbian expatriate basketball people in Poland
Serbian expatriate basketball people in Romania
Serbian expatriate basketball people in Russia
Serbian expatriate basketball people in Spain
Serbian expatriate basketball people in Turkey
Serbian men's basketball players
Trefl Sopot players
2006 FIBA World Championship players
Universiade medalists in basketball
Universiade gold medalists for Serbia and Montenegro
Medalists at the 2003 Summer Universiade